XHDIS-FM is a radio station on 93.7 FM in Ciudad Delicias, Chihuahua. The station is owned by Radiza and known as Flamingo with a pop format.

History
XHDIS received its concession on July 17, 1992 and went on air six days later, the first FM station in Ciudad Delicias. The original concessionaire was Roberto Díaz García.

References

Radio stations in Chihuahua
1992 establishments in Mexico
Radio stations established in 1992